The Sultan Qaboos Stadium at the Sultan Qaboos Sports Complex, also known locally as Boshar, is a government-owned multi-purpose stadium in the Boshar district of Muscat, Oman. It is currently used mostly for football matches, and also has  facilities for athletics. The stadium originally had a capacity of over 40,000, but after recent renovations the capacity was reduced to 28,000. It is the home stadium of the Oman national football team. The Qaboos Stadium was used as the main stadium in the 19th Arabian Gulf Cup in 2009, and was also used in the 13th Arabian Gulf Cup competition in 1996. The Complex has strong security, in addition to over 10,000 parking slots.

In field hockey, the stadium hosted the 2018 Men's Asian Champions Trophy.

References

External links
Sultan Qaboos Sports Complex - WORLD STADIUMS
 

1985 establishments in Oman
Sports venues completed in 1985
Football venues in Oman
Sports venues in Muscat, Oman
Buildings and structures in Muscat, Oman
Athletics (track and field) venues in Oman
Cricket grounds in Oman
National stadiums
Multi-purpose stadiums in Oman